Xima is a town under the administration of Meitan County, Guizhou, China. , it has one residential community and 5 villages under its administration.

References

Township-level divisions of Guizhou
Meitan County